James Arthur Peters (July 13, 1922 – December 18, 1972) was an American herpetologists and zoogeographer.

He was born in Durant, Iowa; raised in Greenup, Illinois. He studied at the University of Michigan and obtained his Ph.D. in biology in 1952. He studied with the herpetologist Norman Edouard Hartweg.

His main subject of research was herpetology and zoogeography of Latin America, especially Ecuador. During his thirty years of research in herpetology he described seventeen new species or subspecies, most of them amphibians, such as a few neotropical toads of the genus Atelopus.

Peters died of liver cancer in 1972 (Irish and Zug 1982).

Career and positions 
He held teaching positions in

Brown University (1952–1958)
 Universidad Central de Ecuador, Fulbright Lecturer (1958–1959)
Southern Illinois University (1959)
San Fernando Valley State College (1959–1966)

He held positions in the Department of Reptiles and Amphibians at the Smithsonian Institution

 Associate Curator (1964–1967)
 Curator (1967–1972)

Peters was a member of professional societies such as: American Society of Ichthyologists and Herpetologists, where he served as secretary, 1960–1966, vice-president, 1967 and president, 1970. He was elected to the Washington Biologists’ Field Club. He inaugurated the Smithsonian Herpetological Information Services which distributed materials to herpetological institutions and individuals. He founded the newsletter MUDPIE (Museum and University Data Program and Information Exchange) providing information on computer programs, references, grants, meetings, etc.

Honors 
Several neotropical amphibians and reptiles are named after him, including Ameerega petersi, Anadia petersi, Andinosaura petrorum, Colostethus jacobuspetersi, Dipsas jamespetersi, Gonatodes petersi, Helicops petersi, Micrurus petersi, Pristimantis petersi, and Tantilla petersi. James Peters is not to be confused with Wilhelm Peters (1815-1883), a German herpetologist, after whom also several species were named. In fact, Andinosaura petrorum was named after both James Peters and Wilhelm Peters, with "petrorum" meaning "of the Peters", honoring both contributions to neotropical herpetology.

Selected works
Peters JA (1960). Snakes of the Subfamily Dipsadinae. University of Michigan Museum of Zoology.
Peters JA, Orejas-Miranda B, Donoso-Barros R (1970). Catalogue of Neotropical Squamata. Washington, District of Columbia: Smithsonian Institution. 2 vols. B9149.
Peters JA (1959). Classic Papers in Genetics. Englewood Cliffs, New Jersey: Prentice-Hall Inc.
Peters JA (1964). Dictionary of Herpetology. New York: Hafner.
Article in the Concise American Heritage Dictionary.
Article in the Encyclopædia Britannica.
The snakes of Ecuador; check list and key (The Museum, Cambridge, 1960).

References

Further reading
Adler, Kraig  (1989). Contributions to the History of Herpetology. Society for the study of amphibians and reptiles.
 Smithsonian Institution Archives. Record Unit 7175 James A. Peters Papers and Records of the Division of Reptiles and Amphibians
Perry MC (editor) (2007). The Washington Biologists’ Field Club: Its Members and its History (1900-2006). Published by the Washington Biologists’ Field Club, Washington, D.C. 352 pp. \9780615162591

External links
The Washington Biologist’s Field Club. P. 224
Today in Science
Irish, F. J.; Zug, George R. Smithsonian Libraries. 1982. Biography and bibliography of James A. Peters
 Smithsonian Institution Archives

1922 births
1972 deaths
University of Michigan alumni
People from Cedar County, Iowa
American herpetologists
20th-century American zoologists
American expatriates in Ecuador
Fulbright alumni